It's a Great Life is a 1929 American comedy film directed by Sam Wood and written by Al Boasberg and Willard Mack. The film stars Rosetta Duncan, Vivian Duncan, Lawrence Gray, Jed Prouty and Benny Rubin. The film was released on December 6, 1929, by Metro-Goldwyn-Mayer.  During production, it was provisionally known as "Cotton and Silk."

Plot
Babe (Vivian Duncan) and Casey (Rosetta Duncan) Hogan are sisters and work in the department store Mandelbaum & Weill in the music sheet department. Once a year there is a big department store show, in which employees act. Babe Hogan in love with the piano player of the music sheet department James Dean (Lawrence Gray) is the younger sister and her older sister Casey is looking very much after her. When the act of Jimmy and Babe doesn't seem to work out she improvises on the stage rescuing the situation, but also starting a new career for the three of them, as a producer was in the audience and liked them.
Unfortunately Casey and Jimmy are antagonists in the trio, so one day they split, when Babe and Jimmy tell Casey they would get married. While Casey tries to get along as a Single Act in small Vaudeville stages, Babe and Jimmy have not a bit of success as the duo Dean and Hogan. Moreover Babe gets a bad cold ending in delirium, so that Jimmy finally puts away his pride and go and see Casey. Meanwhile old colleague David Parker (Jed Prouty) has come to ask Casey to marry him and go with him to Paris that night, as he is appointed Manager of the Paris branch of the store. Casey can't believe that somebody loves her and accepts, but Jimmy convinces her, that Babe is going to die if she doesn't see her sister. The marriage with Parker is off and the three are reunited dreaming to have a big successful show.

Cast 
Rosetta Duncan as Casey Hogan
Vivian Duncan as Babe Hogan
Lawrence Gray as Jimmy Dean
Jed Prouty as Mr. David Parker
Benny Rubin as Benny Friedman
Clarence Burton  as	Policeman  	 
George Davis  	as Store show stage hand  	 
Oscar Apfel  as	Mr. Mandelbaum 	 
George Periolat as 	Mr. Weill	 
Rolfe Sedan  as Vaudeville violinist	 
Ann Dvorak  as	Dancer in "Hoosier Hop" number

References

External links 
 
It's a Great Life at tcm.com

1929 films
1920s color films
1920s English-language films
Silent American comedy films
1929 comedy films
Metro-Goldwyn-Mayer films
Films directed by Sam Wood
American black-and-white films
1920s American films